Below are the squads for the 2022 AFF Championship, which took place between 20 December 2022 to 16 January 2023.

Ten national teams affiliated with ASEAN Football Federation (AFF) and participating in this tournament are required to register squad containing up to 23 players, including three goalkeepers. Only the players from the following squad list are allowed to appear in this tournament.

The age listed is the age of each player on December 20, 2022, the first day of the tournament. The number of appearances and goals listed for each player does not include the match played after the start of the 2022 AFF Campionship. The club listed is the last club where the player concerned plays a competitive match before the tournament. Fold flag for each club According to the State Football Association (not league) the club is affiliated.

Group A

Thailand 
Head coach:  Alexandré Pölking

The final 23-man squad for Thailand was announced on 17 December 2022.

Philippines 
Head coach:  Josep Ferré

The final 23-man squad for the Philippines was announced on 14 December 2022.

Indonesia 
Head coach:  Shin Tae-yong

The final 23-man squad for Indonesia was announced on 19 December 2022.

Cambodia 
Head coach:  Ryu Hirose

The final 23-man squad for Cambodia was announced on 20 December 2022.

Brunei 
Head coach:  Mario Rivera

The final 23-man squad for Brunei was announced on 10 December 2022.

Group B

Vietnam 
Head coach:  Park Hang-seo

The final 23-man squad for Vietnam was announced on 20 December 2022.

Malaysia 
Head coach:  Kim Pan-gon

The final 23-man squad for Malaysia was announced on 16 December 2022.

Singapore 
Head coach:  Takayuki Nishigaya

The final 23-man squad for Singapore was announced on 20 December 2022.

Myanmar 
Head coach:  Antoine Hey

The final 23-man squad for Myanmar was announced on 19 December 2022.

Laos 
Head coach:  Michael Weiß

The final 23-man squad for Laos was announced on 21 December 2022.

Statistics 
Note: Only the final squad list of each national team is taken into consideration.

Age

Outfield players 
Oldest:  Stephan Schröck
Youngest:  Harry Nuñez

Goalkeepers 
Oldest:  Hassan Sunny
Youngest:  Phounin Xayyasone

Captains 
Oldest:  Stephan Schröck
Youngest:  Safawi Rasid

Coaches 
Oldest:  Ryu Hirose
Youngest:  Josep Ferré

Player representation by league system 
Nation in bold are represented at the tournament.

 The Brunei squad is made up entirely of players from the country's domestic league.
 Hassan Sunny of Singapore plays for Albirex Niigata Singapore, a Japanese club playing in the Singapore Premier League.
 Three teams have only one foreign-based player (Cambodia, Malaysia and Vietnam).
 The Myanmar squad has the most players from a single foreign federation, with 5 players playing for Thai clubs.
 Of the countries not represented by a national team at the tournament, Japan provided the most players with three.
 Six players in Thailand's second-tier Thai League 2 represented their countries at the tournament. None of them were Thais.
 The lowest league on a domestic pyramid to have a representative player at the tournament is the Japanese third-tier J3 League. It is represented by the Philippines' Paul Tabinas (Iwate Grulla Morioka).

Player representation by club

Player representation by country confederation

Average age of squads

Coaches representation by country 
Coaches in bold represented their own country.

Notes

References

External links 
 
 2022 AFF Championship on the AFF official website

AFF Championship squads
2022 AFF Championship